Eugenia Malinnikova (born 23 April 1974) is a mathematician, winner of the 2017 Clay Research Award which she shared with Aleksandr Logunov "in recognition of their introduction of a novel geometric combinatorial method to study doubling properties of solutions to elliptic eigenvalue problems".

She competed three times in the International Mathematical Olympiad, winning three Gold medals (including two perfect scores).

She got her PhD from St. Petersburg State University in 1999, under the supervision of Viktor Petrovich Havin. Currently she works as a professor of mathematics at Stanford University after previously working at the Norwegian University of Science and Technology. In 2018 she was inducted into the Norwegian Academy of Science and Letters. She is also a member of the Royal Norwegian Society of Sciences and Letters and the Norwegian Academy of Technological Sciences.

References

External links
Homepage at Norwegian University of Science and Technology

Russian mathematicians
Norwegian mathematicians
Women mathematicians
Academic staff of the Norwegian University of Science and Technology
1974 births
Living people
Members of the Norwegian Academy of Science and Letters
Members of the Norwegian Academy of Technological Sciences
Royal Norwegian Society of Sciences and Letters
International Mathematical Olympiad participants